Clément Mignon (born 21 January 1993) is a French swimmer. He was part of the heat swimmers of the freestyle 4×100 m teams that won medals at the 2014 European Aquatics Championships and 2015 World Aquatics Championships.

References

External links
 
 
 
 

1993 births
Living people
French male freestyle swimmers
Sportspeople from Aix-en-Provence
Olympic swimmers of France
Olympic silver medalists for France
Olympic silver medalists in swimming
Swimmers at the 2016 Summer Olympics
Swimmers at the 2020 Summer Olympics
Medalists at the 2016 Summer Olympics
World Aquatics Championships medalists in swimming
Medalists at the FINA World Swimming Championships (25 m)
European Aquatics Championships medalists in swimming